Harry James was an American musician, bandleader and trumpeter.

Harry James may also refer to:
Harry James (American football) (1881–1947), American football quarterback
Harry James (Australian footballer) (1877–1940), Australian rules footballer for Fitzroy
Harry James (drummer) (born 1960), English drummer
Fugative (Harry James Byart, born 1994), English singer, rapper, songwriter, and record producer
T. G. H. James (1923–2009), British Egyptologist, known as Harry James

See also
Henry James (disambiguation)
Harold James (disambiguation)